Magic Shave is an American brand of chemical depilatory  shaving-related products and other personal care products. It was created by Loreal's skincare division, Softsheen and Carson, in order to reduce skin inflammation, irritation and razor bumps which commonly occurs among black and African-American men.

Advertising
Beginning in May 2016, they began a "Team Up" with Marvel advertising their products with an advertisement comic starring Luke Cage in many issues, including the extremely popular Captain America: Steve Rogers #1

References

External links
Official Website

L'Oréal brands
Hair removal
Shaving
Shaving cream brands